The Best Movie 3-De is a 2011 Russian comedy from  Monumental Pictures (Sony Pictures Entertainment) and Comedy Club Production, continuation of 2009 The Best Movie 2 film, spoofing such famous Russian films as Admiral, Burnt by the Sun 2, Stilyagi, Black Lightning, and others.

Plot

Cast
Garik Kharlamov - Maxim Utyosov
Peter Vince - Alexander Poplavkov
Ekaterina Kuznetsova - Varya Vytrisopleva
Alexander Baluev - Viktor Pavlovich
Valentin Smirnitsky - Edward Rykov
Mikhail Olegovich Yefremov - teacher Misha
Alexander Semchev - Uncle Pasha
Oleg Sorokin - Askold
Alexander Andrienko - Major
Denis Yakovlev - Bondarchuk
Michael Gorsky - Lieutenant

References

External links
 

2011 films
2000s Russian-language films
2011 black comedy films
2010s crime comedy films
Russian 3D films
Russian sequel films
Russian crime comedy films
Russian parody films
Russian black comedy films
2010s parody films
Gangster films
Slapstick films
2011 3D films